Hong Kong competed at the 1996 Summer Olympics in Atlanta, United States, for the last time as a British territory.

At these Games, Hong Kong won its first Olympic medal. Lee Lai Shan won a gold medal in sailing, in the board (mistral) event.

Medalists

Gold
 Lee Lai Shan — sailing, Women's Mistral

Results by event

Swimming
Men's 50m Freestyle
 Arthur Li
 Heat – 23.77 (→ did not advance, 42nd place)

Men's 100m Freestyle
 Arthur Li
 Heat – 51.84 (→ did not advance, 43rd place)

Men's 400m Freestyle
 
 Heat – 4:02.68 (→ did not advance, 29th place)

Men's 200m Butterfly
 Mark Kwok
 Heat – 2:04.01 (→ did not advance, 34th place)

Men's 200m Individual Medley
 Mark Kwok
 Heat – 2:07.61 (→ did not advance, 29th place)

Men's 400m Individual Medley
 Mark Kwok
 Heat – 4:31.13 (→ did not advance, 20th place)

Notes

References

External links
Hong Kong

Nations at the 1996 Summer Olympics
1996
Olympics